Stepan Atayan (born 13 July 1966) is a retired Uzbek international football player who played as a midfielder and was awarded in 1993 as one of the three Best Footballers of the Year. He is currently a veteran at Proodeftiki in Greece.

Club career
Atayan began playing football in the Soviet Second League with Neftchi Baku PFK and Köpetdag Aşgabat. He joined Uzbek League side Neftchi Farg'ona in 1991. Atayan left Uzbekistan and moved to Greece in 1995. He continued his career with Proodeftiki, playing 4 seasons in the Greek Super League for the club.  He joined Chalkidona F.C. in 1999, where he won 2 cups. He finished his football career in Atromitos F.C. in 2001.

International
He was on the Uzbekistani squad at the 1994 Asian Games and made his full debut for Uzbekistan on 18 July 1995 at Merdeka Cup against Hungary won 3:2 by Hungary. Atayan made 9 appearances for the Uzbekistan national football team, including three appearances at the 1996 AFC Asian Cup finals in the United Arab Emirates.

Coaching career
After finishing his football career, Atayan continued with a coaching career. He possesses both the AFC coaching diploma and the UEFA category B coaching license diploma in Greece. He began coaching professionally youth football academy U13, U15, U17, U19. Afterwards, he coached in various football teams including Copa Renti SC owned by Nikos Karoulias in 2001–2004, Fostiras F.C. in 2004–2005, Kallithea F.C. B League in 2011–2012, Proodeftiki in 2012–2013.

Personal life
He got married in 1988, had a daughter (Diana) in 1990 and a son (Arsen) in 1994.

Honours

Club

Neftchi Farg'ona
 Uzbek League (3): 1992, 1993, 1994
 Uzbek Cup (2): 1994, 1996

Individual
 Uzbekistan Footballer of the Year 3rd: 1993

References

External links

Official Facebook Profile

1966 births
Living people
Footballers from Baku
Soviet Armenians
Soviet footballers
Uzbekistani footballers
Uzbekistani expatriate footballers
Uzbekistan international footballers
1996 AFC Asian Cup players
FK Köpetdag Aşgabat players
FK Neftchi Farg'ona players
Proodeftiki F.C. players
atromitos F.C. players
Association football midfielders
Super League Greece players
Expatriate footballers in Greece
Uzbekistani expatriate sportspeople in Greece
Footballers at the 1994 Asian Games
Asian Games gold medalists for Uzbekistan
Asian Games medalists in football
Medalists at the 1994 Asian Games
Ethnic Armenian sportspeople
Uzbekistani people of Armenian descent